Greg "Joz" Joswiak is Senior Vice President, Worldwide Marketing at Apple Inc. He replaced Phil Schiller, who served in a similar role, in 2020. As lead marketer for the company, he oversees marketing of iPads, iPhones, MacBooks and services such as Apple TV+. Per Apple, Joswiak "played a pivotal role in developing and launching...the original iPod and iPhone".

Early life and career
Joswiak graduated with a degree in Computer Engineering from the University of Michigan in 1986. In June 1986, he joined Apple where he worked on early Macintosh computers and supported third-party developers for the Mac platform.

References

External links
Greg Joswiak's Executive Profile at Apple

20th-century American businesspeople
21st-century American businesspeople
American computer businesspeople
Apple Inc. executives
Living people
Place of birth missing (living people)
University of Michigan alumni
Year of birth missing (living people)